Ushytsia can refer to:

 Stara Ushytsia, an urban-type settlement in the Kamianets-Podilskyi Raion of Khmelnytskyi Oblast in Ukraine 
 Nova Ushytsia, an urban-type settlement in the Kamianets-Podilskyi Raion of Khmelnytskyi Oblast
 Nova Ushytsia Raion, a former district of the Khmelnytskyi Oblast
 Ushytsia (river), a tributary of the Dniester in Ukraine